The Beauford H. Jester I Unit is a Texas Department of Criminal Justice substance abuse felony punishment facility (SAFPF) located in unincorporated Fort Bend County, Texas. It is situated on the Jester State Prison Farm property. The current Warden is Lonnie Townsend.

History
The unit opened in 1885, and its first brick building was in 1932.

The unit was originally known as the Harlem I Unit. Under the administration of George Beto, the unit was converted into a pre-release facility. The unit was renamed after Governor of Texas Beauford H. Jester.

In 1935 Jester housed white prisoners. In 1963, before racial desegregation occurred, the facility housed Hispanic and Latino American first-time offenders and prisoners considered by the administration to have good rehabilitative prospects.

Effective 2020, the Jester I and Garza East Unit is slated for closure with a planned transfer of the Jester I inmates to the Stringfellow Unit.

References

External links

 "Jester I Unit." Texas Department of Criminal Justice.

Prisons in Fort Bend County, Texas
1885 establishments in Texas